Jiří Fischer (born July 31, 1980) is a Czech former professional ice hockey defenceman in the National Hockey League (NHL) who played his entire career with the Detroit Red Wings. He currently serves as Detroit's Director of Player Evaluation.  Fischer was selected in the 1998 NHL Entry Draft in the first round, 25th overall, by the Red Wings, and was a part of the team that won the 2002 Stanley Cup.

Fischer's playing career ended after he went into cardiac arrest in a November 2005 game, and narrowly escaped death due to the immediate action of doctors and other arena personnel. He subsequently retired due to his heart problems.

He also served as the assistant coach for the Czech Republic during the 2012 IIHF World Junior Hockey Championships.

Endorsement work
In 2003, Fischer appeared with fellow NHL defenseman Chris Pronger in a television commercial for Dodge Ram trucks. The commercial featured a black Ram truck running along a track, which then smashes into a wall. Fischer and Pronger, along with two other unnamed players, exit the truck in full hockey gear. Pronger then intones "I've been hit harder," and Fischer answers "Me too." The commercial was played during the 2003 NHL Stanley Cup playoffs. Neither defenseman were playing at the time as both were recovering from torn anterior cruciate ligament injuries when the commercial was filmed.

In-game cardiac arrest
During a game on November 21, 2005, against the Nashville Predators, Fischer collapsed on the bench after going into cardiac arrest. After being unconscious for six minutes, Fischer was resuscitated by CPR and by an automated external defibrillator by Dr. Tony Colucci, and was taken to Detroit Receiving Hospital. The game was postponed due to Fischer's injury, and was made up on January 23, 2006. This marked the first time in NHL history a game had been postponed due to injury. The makeup game was played for the full 60 minutes, though the Predators were allowed to maintain their 1-0 lead from the original game. Nashville ultimately won by a score of 3-2.

Fischer was released from the hospital on November 23, 2005. Although the exact cause of Fischer's collapse remained unknown, team physician Tony Colucci indicated that Fischer's heart may have experienced either ventricular tachycardia, a type of racing heartbeat, or ventricular fibrillation, a disorganized cardiac rhythm. Doctors ordered Fischer to avoid all physical activity for four to six weeks, and no prognosis was made on whether he would be able to continue his ice hockey career. Fischer continued to suffer heart trouble after the in-game incident. On November 28, Fischer suffered a "brief, abnormal cardiac rhythm", while at his home in Detroit. He was released from the hospital two days later.

Fischer's future as a hockey player remained in question over a year after his collapse. By the time his contract expired at the end of the 2006-07 season, it was obvious he would never be medically cleared to play again, and he was forced to retire.  General manager Ken Holland wanted to keep Fischer in the organization, and offered him a job as director of player development.  Fischer had long liked working with young players and accepted.

Return to the ice
Fischer returned to the ice for the Detroit Red Wings in the first of two Alumni Showdown games at Comerica Park as part of the 2013 Hockeytown Winter Festival on December 31, 2013, scoring the first goal of the game.

Career statistics

Regular season and playoffs

International

Notes

External links 

The Healthy Hope Jiri Fischer Foundation
Bio from Yahoo! Sports

1980 births
Cincinnati Mighty Ducks players
Czech ice hockey defencemen
Detroit Red Wings executives
Detroit Red Wings draft picks
Detroit Red Wings players
HC Bílí Tygři Liberec players
Hull Olympiques players
Living people
National Hockey League first-round draft picks
People from Hořovice
Stanley Cup champions
Sportspeople from the Central Bohemian Region
Czech expatriate ice hockey players in the United States
Czech expatriate ice hockey players in Canada
Czech sports executives and administrators